Krystyna Panchishko (born 3 June 1998) is a Ukrainian marathon swimmer. She competed in the 2020 Summer Olympics.

She took up swimming in 2003 in Rubizhne, Ukraine.  Her grandmother introduced her to swimming. In 2007 she with her family  moved to live in Kyiv, Ukraine.

From 2012 to the present day, her coach is Mariya Golub (Ukrainian swimming and open water swimming coach). Since 2019, she also trained in Montpellier with Philippe Lucas. She competed in pool swimming at the European junior championships in 2013 and 2014. She began competing in open water swimming at the 2015 Ukrainian Championships.

Participant of the European Junior Open water swimming championships (2015; 2016; 2017);

European aquatics championships (open water) (2016; 2018; 2020 *);

World aquatics championships (open water) (2017; 2019)

References

1998 births
Living people
Ukrainian female swimmers
Olympic swimmers of Ukraine
Swimmers at the 2020 Summer Olympics
Female long-distance swimmers
21st-century Ukrainian women